is a Japanese football club from Kitakanbara, Niigata, currently playing in the Hokushinetsu Football League's 1st Division. They have played in the Emperor's Cup in the past.

The college has produced a number of J.League players, coaches and other staff members across Japan. As of the 2022 season, 54 of the 58 J.League members have at least one player or staff member who are JSC former alumnis. The college claims themselves as the only football vocational school on Japan.

Current squad
.

References

External links
  

Football clubs in Japan
Association football clubs established in 2002
Sports teams in Niigata Prefecture
2002 establishments in Japan